Emile Eugène André Dervain (1928–2010) was a Martinican-Ivorian playwright, lawyer and judge.

Life
Émile Eugène André Dervain was born on February 4, 1928, in Saint-Esprit in central Martinique. He married a woman from the west of the Ivory Coast, and was naturalized as Ivorian in 1967. 

Dervain's Saran ou la Reine scélérate (1968) was a historical play set in the early nineteenth century, in Da Monzon's semi-legendary rule over the kingdom of Ségou, and drawing on oral epic tradition. A prologue invoked classical precedent:

Dervain's 1969 one-act play Abra Pokou was based on Queen Pokou, the mythical founder of the Baoulé people of the Ivory Coast.

Trained as a lawyer, Dervain became a barrister at the Court of First Instance in Abidjan. From 1986 to 1988 he was president of the Bar Association in Abidjan. Dervain went on to serve as judge, prosecutor and investigating judge at the  Court of First Instance. He was also President of the Côte d'Ivoire section of Amnesty International, and a member of the Academy of Sciences, Arts, African Cultures and African Diasporas (ASCAD).

Works
 Saran: ou, La reine scélérate & La langue et le scorpion; pièces en trois et quatre actes [Saran: or, the villainous queen and The tongue and the scorpion: plays in three or four acts]. Yaoundé, Éditions Clé, 1968.
 Abra Pokou; pièce en un acte [Queen Pokou: a play in one act], Yaoundé: Éditions CLE, 1969.
 Termites: théâtre. Paris: P.J. Oswald, 1976.
 Une vie lisse et cruelle: poèmes [A smooth and cruel life: poems]. Abidjan: Edilis, 1999.

References

1928 births
2010 deaths
Martiniquais emigrants
Immigrants to Ivory Coast
20th-century Ivorian lawyers
Ivorian judges
Ivorian dramatists and playwrights
21st-century Ivorian lawyers